Khalid Hossain (4 December 1935 – 22 May 2019) was a Bangladeshi Nazrul Geeti singer. In recognition of his contribution in music, the government of Bangladesh awarded him the country's second highest civilian award Ekushey Padak in 2000.

Early life
Khalid Hossain was born on 4 December 1935 at Krishnanagar, Nadia in the then British India now West Bengal. After the partition of India in 1947, he migrated to the Court Para village of Kushtia District with his family. In 1964, he permanently moved to Dhaka.

Career
Khalid Hossain served as the president of Bangladesh Nazrul Sangeet Sangstha.

Awards
 Nazrul Academy Award (2007)
 Bangladesh Shilpakala Academy Award
 Ekushey Padak (2000)

References

1935 births
2019 deaths
People from Nadia district
20th-century Bangladeshi male singers
20th-century Bangladeshi singers
21st-century Bangladeshi male singers
21st-century Bangladeshi singers
Bangladeshi Nazrul Geeti singers
Recipients of the Ekushey Padak
Singers from West Bengal